Andrew Glass may refer to:

Sportspeople
Andrew Glass (born 1989), American ice hockey player drafted in 2007, on List of Washington Capitals draft picks
Andrew Glass (born 1989), Australian hockey goaltender with the Australia men's national inline hockey team

Others
Andrew Glass, builder of McRaven House
Andrew Glass, illustrator of Graven Images (book)
Andrew Glass, journalist  for Politico
Andrew Glass, musician and founding member of the band Solstice (UK progressive rock band)
Andrew Glass, scholar who has published fragments of the Gandhāran Buddhist texts